Old Trinity Church is a historic Episcopal church at 1716 Taylors Island Road in Church Creek, Maryland. It was built around 1675 of red brick and is one of the oldest church buildings in continuous use in the continental United States and original thirteen states. The church was restored in the 1950s and still holds regular Sunday worship services and has an active burial ground.

See also
List of the oldest churches in the United States
List of the oldest buildings in Maryland

References

External links
Official website

Episcopal church buildings in Maryland
Churches in Dorchester County, Maryland
Churches completed in 1675
17th-century churches in the United States
17th-century Episcopal church buildings
1675 establishments